America's manufacturers in World War II were engaged in the greatest military industrial effort in history. Aircraft companies went from building a handful of planes at a time to building them by the thousands on assembly lines. Aircraft manufacturing went from a distant 41st place among American industries to first place in less than five years.

In 1939, total aircraft production for the US military was less than 3,000 planes.  By the end of the war, America produced 300,000 planes.  No war was more industrialized than World War II.  It was a war won as much by machine shops as by machine guns.

In January 1939, President Franklin D. Roosevelt appealed to Congress for $300 million to be spent on procuring aircraft for the Army Air Corps. At the time the Corps had approximately 1,700 aircraft in total. Congress responded and authorized the procurement of 3,251 aircraft.

The American aircraft industry was given impetus at the early part of the war by the demand from the British and French for aircraft to supplement their own domestic production. The 1939 Neutrality Act permitted belligerents to acquire armaments from US manufacturers provided they paid in cash and used their own transportation - "cash and carry". The British Purchasing Commission had been set up prior to the war to arrange purchase of aircraft and the British and French dealt directly with manufacturers paying from their financial reserves. After France fell to Germany, many of the orders for aircraft were taken over by the British. By 1940, the British had ordered $1,200,000,000 worth of aircraft. This led to some aircraft, such as the North American P-51 Mustang, being designed and produced to meet European requirements and then being adopted by the US. In their need for aircraft the Anglo-French commission also ordered designs from manufacturers that had failed to win US Army contracts - e.g. the Martin Model 167.

The American aircraft industry was able to adapt to the demands of war. In 1939 contracts assumed single-shift production, but as the number of trained workers increased, the factories moved to first two- and then a three-shift schedules. The government aided development of capacity and skills by placing "Educational orders" with manufacturers, and new government-built plants for the private firms to use.

Aircraft companies built other manufacturer's designs; the B-17 Flying Fortress was built by Boeing (the designer), Lockheed Vega, and Douglas Aircraft. Automotive companies joined schemes to produce aircraft components and also complete aircraft. Ford set up the Willow Run production facility and built complete Consolidated B-24 Liberators as well as sections to be assembled at other plants.

Total production

¹July–December   
²January–August

Recipients of U.S. aircraft production

Analysis
William S. Knudsen, an automotive industry executive who was made Chairman of the Office of Production Management and member of the National Defense Advisory Commission by the Roosevelt administration to organize war production, said, "We won because we smothered the enemy in an avalanche of production, the like of which he had never seen, nor dreamed possible."

See also
Air warfare of World War II
World War II aircraft production
American armored fighting vehicle production during World War II

References

Sources
"
AAF Digest Table 79 Army Air Forces Statistical Digest,  World War II www.usaaf.net

Production